Tomáš Berger (born 22 August 1985) is a Czech former football player, who played for FK Dukla Prague, FC Viktoria Plzeň and Bohemians 1905.

Berger joined Dukla from Sparta Prague, playing for the club in the Prague Championship before its progression into professional football.

In the 2011–12 season, Berger played top-flight football for the first time. He played in all 16 of Dukla's matches before the winter break, scoring twice. In January 2012, Berger moved on loan to FC Viktoria Plzeň for six months, with the option of a permanent transfer.

On 16 February 2012, Berger made his competitive debut for Plzeň, coming on as a substitute in the 2011–12 UEFA Europa League knockout phase match against FC Schalke 04. Berger made a total of four league appearances in the spring half of the season, playing a total of 42 minutes of league football. This was in addition to 32 minutes played across two Europa League fixtures. Berger returned to Dukla in the summer of 2012.

Berger scored 10 league goals in the 2015–16 season. In June 2016, his contract with Dukla expired and he signed a two-year contract as a free agent with Prague-based Bohemians 1905. Following the 2016–17 season, in which he scored two goals in 19 games for Bohemians, mainly appearing as a substitute, Berger and the club agreed to terminate his contract a year early.

Personal life
Berger is the son of Sparta Prague legend Jan Berger, who also played for Dukla Prague.

References

External links
 
 Guardian Football

Footballers from Prague
Czech footballers
Czech First League players
1985 births
Living people
FK Dukla Prague players
FC Viktoria Plzeň players
Bohemians 1905 players
Association football midfielders